The Lyceum of Subic Bay, Inc. (LSB) is a non-stock, non-profit  college in the Philippines,  was established in the Subic Bay Freeport Zone in June 2003.

History 
During the first year of its operation, the institution was registered in the Securities and Exchange Commission (SEC) as National College of Science and Technology, Inc. (NCST) with Alfonso E. Borda as its first president and chief executive officer. In April 2005 the board of trustees approved the change of the name to Lyceum of Subic Bay to provide a broadened course offering.

The college is approved to offer the first two years towards a bachelor in elementary education (BEEd) with a major in early childhood, and the first two years towards the bachelor in secondary education (BSEd) major in English. It also offers other programs at the undergraduate and certificate level.

The school has a number of sports teams active in Philippines college leagues, as a member of the National Athletic Association of Schools, Colleges and Universities (NAASCU) and of Philippine Collegiate Champions League (PCCL): 
basketball    
volleyball (the women's team won the 2009-1010 NAASCU championship)  

Though Lyceum of Subic Bay includes the word lyceum in its name, is not affiliated with Lyceum of the Philippines University which has campuses in Manila, Makati, Batangas, Laguna and Cavite.

Academics

CHED PROGRAMS
ARCHITECTURE
 B.S. in Architecture
BUSINESS
 B.S. IN ACCOUNTANCY (BSA)
 B.S. IN BUSINESS ADMINISTRATION
Major in Financial Management (BSBA-FM)
Major in Human Resource Development Management (BSBA-HRDM)

ENGINEERING
 B.S. in Computer Engineering (BSCOE)
 B.S. in Electrical Engineering	
 B.S. in Electronics Engineering (BSECE)
 B.S. in Industrial Engineering  (BSIE)

Tourism, Hospitality & Culinary
 B.S. IN HOTEL AND RESTAURANT MANAGEMENT (BSHRM)
 B.S. IN TRAVEL MANAGEMENT (BSTRM)

IT, Computer Science & Programming
 B.S. in Information Technology (BSIT)
 B.S. in Computer Science major in Digital Arts and Animation

SOCIAL SCIENCE
 B.S. IN CRIMINOLOGY (BSCRIM)
 B.S. in Psychology (BSPSY)

ADMINISTRATION
 B.S. IN CUSTOMS ADMINISTRATION (BSCA)

TECH-VOC
 ASSOCIATE IN COMPUTER TECHNOLOGY (ACT) TESDA PROGRAMS 
 TOURISM, HOTEL AND RESTAURANT OPERATION (THRO)
BUNDLED PROGRAMS:
 HOUSE KEEPING NC II
 FOOD & BEVERAGE NC II
 BARTENDING NC II
 FRONT OFFICE NC II
 HEALTH CARE SERVICES (PRACTICAL NURSING)
 CAREGIVER NC II (6 MONTHS)

References

External links
school web site

Universities and colleges in Olongapo